The Gentlemen (Chinese: 来自水星的男人) is a Singaporean drama series produced and telecast on Mediacorp Channel 8. The 20-episode drama serial stars Chen Hanwei, Pierre Png, Aloysius Pang, Cynthia Koh, Paige Chua and Carrie Wong as the main casts of the series. The first episode airs on Tuesday (August 9, 2016), 8:29pm, right after the live telecast of the nation's 51st National Day Parade. The show aired at 9pm on weekdays and had a repeat telecast at 8am the following day. The drama will be re-aired again, on 3 March 2019 at 4:30pm.

Plot
The three Zhang brothers come from a family of male chauvinists. Zhang Naiping (Chen Hanwei), the eldest, runs a maid agency. He and his wife, Zou Huimin (Cynthia Koh), are in the midst of divorce proceedings. The second brother, Zhang Nailiang (Pierre Png), is a ballet dancer, while the youngest, Zhang Naiyi (Aloysius Pang), is a students at an arts school. The family is at Naiyi's graduation ceremony. Naiping and Nailiang quarrel over a seat and are sent out of the auditorium. Their mother, He Zhaodi (Jin Yinji), bemoans the death of her husband, Zhang Weida (Zhang Wei), who died half a year ago. She is sad he is not at Naiyi's graduation. Nailiang idolises Xu Ruoqi (Kelly Liao), a dancer. When she picks him for an audition, he is elated. Naiping comes across a maid while she is being abused. Annoyed by the arrogance of the employer, he gets into a brawl with him. They settle their dispute at a police station. Caught up with her job as an insurance agent, Huimin pays no attention to Naiping's injuries. She reminds him to tell Zhaodi about their divorce as soon as possible. Nailiang rents a place on his own. He is confident he will audition successfully and get to join Ruoqi in New York. Naiyi was traumatised by a man with red nails when he was young. Since then, he has had a fear of women whose nails are painted red. Naiyi forgets to retrieve his ATM card after withdrawing money. Sally, who is in the queue behind him, chases after him to return his card. He goes berserk when he sees her red nails and hides in a lingerie shop. The lingerie shop owner is Wang Shengyi (Wang Yuqing). His daughter, Wang Kaixin (Carrie Wong), is nicknamed Princess A Class for her flat chest. She is able to tell the customer's bra cup size by just looking at them. Naiping does not wish to divorce his wife but is too proud to admit it. On his way to the audition, Nailiang notices Su Meidai (Paige Chua), who shooting a print advertisement. Watching her pose seductively while clad only in sexy lingerie, Nailiang trips over a cable. Meidai falls onto him, and the shoot is halted. During the audition, Nailing becomes dizzy and faints while dancing. A debt collector turns up at Naiping's office. Naiping refuses to entertain him, as it was his business partner, Gary, who obtained the loan. The debt collector vandalises the office. Naiyi reports for work at a fashion design company. Sally happens to be one of his colleagues, and tries to return his ATM card. He is so traumatised by her red nails that he spills his beverage...

Cast

Main cast

Supporting cast

Development
The series is first announced in January 2016. Originally, Julie Tan and Xu Bin were also announced to be part of the lineup. Their roles were replaced by Carrie Wong and Aloysius Pang respectively, as Julie turned down the series to allow herself to focus on her role in long-running drama series Peace & Prosperity. Wong was told that she would have to have her long locks shorn for her role, as executive producer Soh Bee Lian feels that the character would be more convincing in a bob cut than if she were to wear a wig.

Filming began in February 2016. On 9 March, Toggle interviewed Pang, whose character falls in love with Paige Chua’s. The actors shot the scene where Chua saves his life when Pang falls over a railing at a parking complex in two hours. He was suspended from a third-floor ledge, with a ladder propping him up by the feet during breaks. Pierre Png, who plays a professional ballet dancer in the series, reveals that ballet is “much, much tougher” than boxing (referring to his previous role in Channel 5 telemovie Rise). While others have to take seven years to perfect ballet, he only has one month for his role.

A press conference was held at Cafe Melba in the new Mediacorp campus on 26 July 2016. Chen Hanwei, Pierre Png, Aloysius Pang, Carrie Wong, Paige Chua, Cynthia Koh and Jin Yinji attended the conference.

Trivia
This will be Aloysius Pang and Carrie Wong's second drama collaboration as onscreen couple, after Life - Fear Not.
This will be Chen Hanwei, Carrie Wong, Youyi, Jin Yinji and Wang Yuqing's second drama collaboration, after 118.
The series was repeated at 8am. 
Snippets of the next episode are shown during the ending credits of each episode. This is the 15th series where News Tonight commentaries are not announced.
The Series is repeating on MediaCorp Channel 8 at 5.30pm after succeeding  The Queen.

Awards & Nominations

Star Awards 2017
The Gentlemen was up for 5 nominations. It won 2 out of 5 awards.

See also
 List of programmes broadcast by Mediacorp Channel 8
 List of The Gentlemen episodes

References

Singapore Chinese dramas
2016 Singaporean television series debuts
2016 Singaporean television series endings
Channel 8 (Singapore) original programming